Jelger Wiegersma (born 4 December 1981) is a Dutch Magic: The Gathering player. Though no longer a professional player, he still regularly attends Pro Tours. He won Pro Tour Seattle 2004 as a member of team Von Dutch with teammates Jeroen Remie and Kamiel Cornelissen. He also won two Grand Prix, in 2003 and 2008. In 2008, he was elected to the Magic: The Gathering Hall of Fame.

Career
Jelger Wiegersma first played on the Pro Tour in the 1998–99 season at Pro Tour New York. Despite a strong finish at Pro Tour Chicago, missing the top eight only on tiebreakers, Wiegersma was unable to establish himself on the Pro Tour in the season following his debut. In the season after that Wiegersma got his first taste of success. He played all but one of the Pro Tours that year, and made the top four of Grand Prix Turin with teammates Kamiel Cornelissen and Tom van de Logt.

In 2001–02 Wiegersma managed to make the top eight of a Pro Tour for the first time. At Pro Tour New Orleans he reached the semifinals before losing to Tomi Walamies for a third-place finish. To follow up on this performance, Wiegersma made the top eight of three Grand Prix, in Lisbon, Heidelberg, and Naples, that season.

By comparison, 2002–03 was a much less impressive season for Wiegersma. His only notable finish was a fifth-place finish at Grand Prix Prague. However, the following season was very successful. Wiegersma started the season with success in the Rochester Draft format. He finished eighth at Grand Prix Lyon and won Grand Prix Götheborg, both of which used that format. Later that season, Wiegersma made his second Pro Tour top at Pro Tour Kobe. Another semifinal exit, this time losing to Gabriel Nassif, saw him finish fourth. His success that season did not stop there. With teammates Kamiel Cornelissen, and Jeroen Remie, Wiegersma won Pro Tour Seattle, defeating Tsuyoshi Ikeda, Itaru Ishida, and Jin Okomoto in the finals.

After failing to make the top eight of any Pro Tours or Grand Prix events in 2005, Wiegersma returned to the top eight at the premier event level in 2006. That season, he made the top eight of four Grand Prix across three continents, finishing 3rd at Grand Prix Barcelona and Yamagata, 8th at Grand Prix Toronto, and fifth at Grand Prix Malmö. And while he didn't make any Pro Tour top eights, he showed remarkable consistency by finishing in the money at every Pro Tour in the 2005 and 2006 seasons, with the exception of Pro Tour Los Angeles 2005.

Wiegersma's next top eight finishes came in 2008. He finished fourth at Grand Prix Birmingham, and won Grand Prix Indianapolis. That same year, he was inducted into the Magic: The Gathering Hall of Fame with Dirk Baberowski, Mike Turian, Olivier Ruel, and Ben Rubin.

Since the 2012 season, Wiegersma has been a member of the team now known as 'The Pantheon', alongside players such as Kai Budde, Jon Finkel, and Gabriel Nassif. At Pro Tour Dark Ascension in 2012 he made his first Pro Tour Top 8 since winning Pro Tour Seattle in 2004, and in 2015 he finished third at Pro Tour Fate Reforged. Later that season, at Grand Prix Montreal, he made the top of a Grand Prix event for the first time in seven years, and he finished the 2014–15 season with enough Pro Points to earn Platinum membership in the Pro Player Club as well as captainship of the Dutch National team for the 2015 World Magic Cup.

Accomplishments

References

Living people
Dutch Magic: The Gathering players
1981 births
Sportspeople from Eindhoven